Fricson Vinicio George Tenorio (born 16 September 1974) is a retired Ecuadorian football defender.

Club career
George played for a number of Ecuadorian teams including Filanbanco, Delfin and Barcelona SC. He also played for Brazilian giants Santos.

International career
He made his debut for the national team in 1999.

Honours

Club
 Barcelona Sporting Club
 Serie A de Ecuador: 1997

References

1974 births
Living people
Sportspeople from Esmeraldas, Ecuador
Association football defenders
Ecuadorian footballers
Ecuador international footballers
1999 Copa América players
Delfín S.C. footballers
Barcelona S.C. footballers
Santos FC players
C.D. El Nacional footballers
Guayaquil City F.C. footballers
Ecuadorian expatriate footballers
Ecuadorian expatriate sportspeople in Brazil
Expatriate footballers in Brazil